The Six Wives of Henry VIII is a 1991 history book, an account of Henry VIII's marriages by British historian Alison Weir.

The book was Weir's first historical work since her first book, Britain's Royal Families. It is divided into three sections - "Catherine of Aragon," "The Great Matter" and "How many wives will he have?"

1991 non-fiction books
20th-century history books
British non-fiction books
Books about United Kingdom royalty
Cultural depictions of the wives of Henry VIII
Books about monarchs
Books by Alison Weir